David Golder is writer Irène Némirovsky's first novel. It was re-issued in 2004 following the popularity of the Suite Française notebooks discovered in 1998. David Golder was first published in France in 1929 and won instant acclaim for the 26-year-old author.

Plot summary

The novel opens with Golder refusing to help his colleague of many years, Marcus. As a result of this, Marcus, bankrupt, commits suicide. Following the funeral, Golder travels to Biarritz where he has a huge, opulent house. His wife and daughter reside there in luxury, spending Golder's cash like water. On the train, he suffers a heart attack. Seriously ill, he is forced to re-evaluate his life.

Major themes
David Golder is a self-made man. From humble beginnings as a Jew in Ukraine selling rags, he is now a cold, ruthless businessman. It is suggested by his wife, Gloria, that Marcus is not the only casualty of Golder's brutal dealings. However he has an Achilles heel, well hidden: his feckless daughter, Joyce. It is this weakness that eventually ruins him.

Now 68 and dying, he realises that his wealth has not brought him happiness; simply a grim satisfaction that, as "a good Jew" he has provided for his uncaring family. Gloria and Joyce are portrayed as grasping and selfish, barely showing concern or interest in Golder except when they need more money for jewellery, furs, cars and cash for their lovers.

The novel is an astonishing portrayal of a businessman and his family in the years leading up to the Great Depression. It also introduces characters of great depth, like Soifer, the old German Jew who "walks on tiptoe" to save shoe leather; he is Golder's only connection with the old world from which he himself came. His wife, Gloria, (Havke is her Yiddish name) is as beautiful, cold and hard as the jewels she so treasures. But it is Joyce, Golder's 18-year-old daughter, who is central to the story. It is she who ultimately causes his ruin.

Adaptations
In 1930 the novel was made into a film David Golder directed by Julien Duvivier and starring Harry Baur as the title character.

In March 2010 the book was dramatised in five episodes on BBC Radio 4, with David Suchet as David Golder.  It was directed by Peter Farago.

Autobiographical
Nemirovsky's mother, "Fanny," whom Irene loathed, had two things in her safe when she died in 1972, copies of her daughter's novels Jezebel and David Golder.

External links

1929 French novels
Novels by Irene Nemirovsky
French novels adapted into films